The Brass Bowl is a 1924 American mystery film directed by Jerome Storm and written by Thomas Dixon Jr. It is based on the 1907 novel The Brass Bowl by Louis Joseph Vance. The film stars Edmund Lowe, Claire Adams, Jack Duffy, J. Farrell MacDonald, Leo White and Fred J. Butler. The film was released on November 16, 1924, by Fox Film Corporation.

Plot
As described in a review in a film magazine, Dan Maitland (Lowe), an adventurous young wealthy chap, sees a mysterious woman leaving his apartment and finds her fingerprints on a blotter which he covers with a brass bowl. Visiting his lawyer who cautions him about the menace of a noted jewel thief, Dan again sees the young woman and follows her in his car. She meets with an accident and, in helping her, she steals his car. Dan walks to his estate and finds the girl robbing his safe. She mistakes him for the thief who is his double. Accepting the situation and trusting the girl he opens the safe and gives her the jewels. The real thief appears, and Dan captures him after a struggle but he gets away. Then follows a series of exciting situations in which Anisty poses as Maitland, confusing everybody and leading to a variety of complications which are finally straightened out when Maitland succeeds in capturing Anisty after a running fight in the elevators of an office building and declares his love for the girl who confesses she turned thief only to get papers from Maitland that would have in- criminated her father.

Cast            
Edmund Lowe as Dan Maitland / Anisty
Claire Adams as Sylvia
Jack Duffy as O'Hagan
J. Farrell MacDonald as Hickey
Leo White as Taxi driver
Fred J. Butler as Bannerman

See also      
Masquerade (1929)

References

External links
 

1924 films
American mystery films
1924 mystery films
Fox Film films
Films directed by Jerome Storm
American silent feature films
American black-and-white films
1920s English-language films
1920s American films
Silent mystery films